Barbara Abart (born 18 August 1985, in Schlanders, Italy) is an Italian luger who has competed since 2001. A natural track luger, she won the silver medal in the women's singles event at the 2005 FIL World Luge Natural Track Championships in Latsch, Italy.

Abart also won the bronze medal in the women's singles event at the 2004 FIL European Luge Natural Track Championships in Hüttau, Austria.

References
 
 
 Natural track World Championships results: 1979–2007

External links
 

1985 births
Italian female lugers
Living people
Italian lugers
People from Schlanders
Sportspeople from Südtirol